John Harvie was a Scottish footballer who played for Falkirk, Clydebank, Johnstone and Dumbarton during the 1910s and 1920s, mainly as a wing half. He also had a short loan spell with Kilmarnock.

References 

Scottish footballers
Dumbarton F.C. players
Falkirk F.C. players
Scottish Football League players
Scottish Junior Football Association players
Johnstone F.C. players
Kilmarnock F.C. players
Clydebank F.C. (1914) players
Benburb F.C. players
Association football wing halves
Year of birth missing
Year of death missing
Footballers from West Dunbartonshire